Black Cap may refer to:
Black cap, a cap formerly worn by English judges when passing the death sentence
The Black Cap, a London gay pub
Black Cap (Antarctica), a peak on Teall Island
Black Cap Mountain (Alaska), a mountain in Glacier Bay National Park, Alaska, US
Black Cap Mountain, a mountain in Penobscot County, Maine, US
Black Cap (mountain), a mountain in Conway, New Hampshire, US
Black Caps, the New Zealand national cricket team
Rubus occidentalis or black cap raspberry
Black cap, a kind of baked apple

See also
Blackcap (disambiguation)
Blackcaps (disambiguation)
Black-capped chickadee, a small North American songbird
Black hat (disambiguation)